is a district located in Okayama Prefecture, Japan.

As of 2003, the district has an estimated population of 31,845 and a density of 79.65 persons per km2. The total area is 399.83 km2.

Towns and villages 

Aida District consists of the following village:
Nishiawakura

History 
Prior to March 31, 2005, Aida District included

Aida
Higashiawakura
Mimasaka
Nishiawakura
Ōhara
Sakutō

On that date, all but Nishiawakura merged to form the new city of Mimasaka.

Districts in Okayama Prefecture
Articles lacking sources from June 2009
All articles lacking sources